Gum Nanse, (born 25 September 1947) is a South Korea conductor. In 1977, he was the first Korean to win the prize at the Herbert von Karajan Conductors' Competition in Berlin. He is currently general director and artistic director of the Seongnam Philharmonic Orchestra and Hankyung Philharmonic Orchestra. He is also the founder and artistic director of New World Philharmonic Orchestra. He currently serves as the principal of Seoul Arts High School. However, according to a staff from Seoul Arts High School on August 16, 2019, he was recently decided to be dismissed, and a new principal will be inaugurated on August 28. Gum Nanse spent 396 days, nearly 40% of his school working days, in Seongnam Philharmonic Orchestra, a private orchestra, for four years.
He was audited by the Seoul Metropolitan Office of Education in early April, due to negligence in service and in violating the prohibition of double employment.

Early life
Gum was born in Busan, is the son of Suhyun Gum who was a composer and music educator. He studied music at Seoul Arts High School and studied musical composition at Seoul National University. He also studied conducting at the Universität der Künste in Berlin under Prof. Hans-Martin Rabenstein.

Career

In 1977, Gum was one of the prize winners (4th prize) at the Herbert von Karajan Conductor's Competition and was the first Korean conductor to be given an opportunity to conduct the Berlin Philharmonic. Since returning home in 1980, he was appointed as the conductor of KBS Symphony Orchestra for 12 years.

In 1992, he moved to Suwon Philharmonic Orchestra. At that time Suwon Philharmonic Orchestra was a struggling ensemble and had difficulties attracting audiences to their concerts. Gum concentrated on improving the quality of the performance and on refreshing orchestra's image. 

While he was in Suwon, Gum organized a series of special concerts with Suwon Philharmonic such as 7-hour Marathon Concert and New Year's Eve Concert at Seoul Arts Center. Also, Gum began a new educative concert series for young students in collaboration with Seoul Arts Center in 1994 titled, 'Young People's Concerts with Gum Nanse'. The concerts were particularly popular among young students and the concerts remained sold-out for six consecutive years from 1994 to 1999.

During Gum's appointment as artistic director, Suwon Philharmonic's number of concerts increased from about 10 concerts per year to more than 60 concerts per year. Suwon Philharmonic Orchestra’s turnaround soon gathered media’s attention and in 1995, Samsung Electronics(headquartered in Suwon) built a new outdoor concert hall and rehearsal facilities for Suwon City and Suwon Philharmonic. Samsung Electronics also sponsored Suwon Philharmonic Orchestra for five years and its overseas tours in US, Canada, UK, Spain, Thailand (for 1998 Asian Games in Bangkok) for three years.

Since 1997, Gum has been primarily engaged in the activities of Euro-Asian Philharmonic Orchestra (now, New World Philharmonic Orchestra) which he founded. Apart from New World Philharmonic, he served as the artistic director of Gyeonggi Philharmonic Orchestra (2006–10) and Incheon Philharmonic Orchestra (2010–14) consecutively.

In interviews, Gum often stresses that classical musicians should be "proactive and extend their talents to the audience regardless of venues". As an example, Gum gave a series of symphonic concerts in the lobby of POSCO Center(POSCO's main headquarters building in Seoul) since 1999. In the lobby of POSCO Center, Gum and Euro-Asian Philharmonic gave concerts with programs that included complete Beethoven, Tchaikovsky and Brahms Symphonies.

In recent years, Gum has been active as a festival director. Notably he founded the 'Music Isle Festival in Jeju’ (since 2005) and the 'Manhattan Chamber Music Festival’ (since 2012). The Music Isle Festival in Jeju joined the European Festivals Association(EFA) in 2010.

Gum is principal of Seoul Arts High School (Seoul Yego) and regularly conducts Korea United College Orchestra (KUCO) which consists of non-music major students from 25 universities nationwide. He also conducts Korea Young Dream Orchestra (KYDO) which consists of young, amateur music-loving adolescents from 25 small provincial towns once a year.

Currently, Gum is artistic director of Seongnam Philharmonic Orchestra and Hankyung Philharmonic Orchestra. In September 2015, Gum was also appointed as the principal guest conductor of Slovak Radio Symphony Orchestra.

As of now, Gum holds the positions of below:

 Artistic director and conductor of New World Philharmonic Orchestra – since 1997
 Artistic director and conductor of Seongnam Philharmonic Orchestra – since 2015
 Artistic director and conductor of Hankyung Philharmonic – since 2015
 Principal guest conductor of Slovak Radio Symphony Orchestra – since 2015
 President of Seoul Arts High School (Seoul Yego) – since 2013
 Artistic director of Raum Art Center – since 2012
 Artistic director of Manhattan Chamber Music Festival – since 2012
 Artistic director of Jeju Music Isle Festival – since 2005
 Artistic director of Busan Chamber Music Festival – since 2014
 Artistic director of Euro-Asian Music Festival – since 2015
 Artistic director of Korea United College Orchestra (KUCO) – since 2010
 Artistic director of Korea Young Dream Orchestra (KYDO) – since 2011
 Chairman of Korea Orchestra Association (KOA) – since 2011

Awards and honors
 1977 Herbert von Karajan Young Conductor's Competition
 1995 Order of Culture Merit "Og-Gwan"
 1999 Grand Prize of Korea Music Critics Association
 2008 Honorary Doctorate Degree from Keimyung University
 2009 Grand Prize of Performing Arts Management Association of Korea
 2010 Hyoryung Prize – Cultural sector
 2011 Presidential Prize of Sejong Cultural Award – Cultural Sector

TV appearances
 2010. 5. 19 MBC <황금어장-무릎팍도사>
 2011 KBS Prime <Kids Classic Audition> / <키즈 클래식 오디션>
 2012 KBS <Qualifications of Men> – Family Choir / <남자의 자격> 시즌 3 – 패밀리 합창단
 2012. 12. 4 KBS <Kim Seungwoo's WinWin> – Episode 140 / <김승우의 승승장구> – 140회
 2014–2015 tvN <Always Cantare> Season 1, 2 / <언제나 칸타레> 시즌 1,2

Publications
 《나는 작은새, 금난새》 Design House, 1996-12-31 
 《금난새의 클래식 여행》 Think Tree, 2003-9-30 
 《금난새의 클래식 여행 1》 Think Tree, 2006–10 
 《금난새의 클래식 여행 2》 Think Tree, 2006–10 
 《내가 사랑한 교향곡》 Think Tree, 2008-12-23 
 《모든 가능성을 지휘하라》 Yaekyung, 2015-3-2

References

1947 births
Living people
People from Busan
Seoul National University alumni
South Korean conductors (music)
21st-century conductors (music)